Sunny Bawra and Inder Bawra are an Indian music composer duo active in films and television.

Personal information
Inderjeet Singh Bawra and Paramjeet Singh "Sunny" Bawra are the sons of Major Singh Bawra.  They were born and raised in Bhatinda, Punjab. The elder of the two, Inder, moved to Mumbai in April 2000.  He had shown an interest in music since childhood. Later, younger brother Sunny joined him there (2004).  They started composing music for various shows. They composed music for several TV shows: Devon Ke Dev...Mahadev on Life OK, Maharana Partap on Sony, Buddhaa-Rajaon Ka Raja, Jai Shree Krishna on Colors. Veer Shivaji, Ashoka, Navya, Siya ke Ram, Haatim, Jhaansi ki rani. Sankatmochan Mahabali Hanuman, Vighanharta Ganesha on Sony.

Discography

Movies Songs and Background Score 
2013 - Ankur Arora Murder Case (1 song)
2014 - Hate Story 2 (Background Score)
2015 - Hate Story 3 (Background Score)
2016 - Rocky Handsome (Songs and Background Score)
2016 - Wajah Tum Ho (Background Score)
2016 - Madaari
2016 - Ambarsariya (Background Score)
2016 - Kaptaan (Background Score)
2017 - Jora 10 Numbaria (Title Song & Background Score)
2018 - Badhaai Ho (1 song)
2018 - Hate Story 4 (Background Score)
2018 - Rang Punjab (Background Score)
2019 - ‘’Hotel Mumbai’’ (Humein Bharat Kahte hai)
2020 - Jora - The Second Chapterr (Background Score)
2020 - Hacked (Tujhe Hasil Karunga)
2020 - Aashram (All Songs) on MX Player Directed by Prakash Jha
2021 - The Girl on the Train (2 Songs)

Non Film Songs
2019 - B for Bhangra on Zee Music
2019 - Whatsapp Song Zee Music
2019 - Tik Tok Zee Music
2019 - Rula Ke Gaya Ishq Zee Music
2020 - Dil Laya Dimaag Laya Zee Music
2020 - Shopping Kara Dunga Zee Music
2020 - Teri Baat Aur Hai Zee Music
2020 - Challon Ka Nishaan, Zee Music

Awards and nominations
Won the Indian Telly Award in the Year 2015 for Raziya Sultan on &TV.

Won the Jio Filmfare Award Punjabi 2018 for the Best Background Score for Jora 10 Numbaria.

References 

Indian film score composers
People from Bathinda